Fred O'Connor (born September 1, 1939) is a former American football coach and administrator whose career spanned more than 30 years at the high school, collegiate, and professional levels. He served in coaching positions in the National Football League (NFL), Canadian Football League (CFL), and World Football League (WFL). Most notably, O'Connor was the interim head coach of the NFL's San Francisco 49ers for the last seven games of the 1978 season, posting a mark of 1–6. He also was the executive director of athletics at The Catholic University of America from May 1984 through June 1990 and served as the Cardinals head football coach for three seasons (1987–1989), compiling an overall college football record of 17 wins and 13 losses.

O'Connor began his professional football career as the offensive backfield coach on Jack Pardee's staffs with both the World Football League's Florida Blazers in 1974 and the Chicago Bears for three seasons from 1975 to 1977. He was reunited with Pardee in a similar capacity with the Washington Redskins on February 5, 1979.Coached three Hall of Fame Running Backs, Walter Payton, O.J. Simpson and John Riggins.  Also coached in four All-Star games; 1976 Senior Bowl, 1978 Challenge Bowl and the 2009 and 2010 Texas vs The Nation games.

Head coaching record

College

NFL

References

External links
 Fred O'Connor at Pro-Football-Reference.com

1939 births
Living people
Catholic University Cardinals athletic directors
Catholic University Cardinals football coaches
Chicago Bears coaches
East Stroudsburg University of Pennsylvania alumni
Florida Atlantic Owls football coaches
High school football coaches in New York (state)
LIU Post Pioneers football coaches
Maryland Terrapins football coaches
Montreal Alouettes coaches
National Football League offensive coordinators
San Francisco 49ers coaches
San Francisco 49ers head coaches
Southern Miss Golden Eagles football coaches
Sportspeople from Brooklyn
Villanova Wildcats football coaches
Washington Redskins coaches